Mark Anthony Farrington (born 15 June 1965) is an English former professional footballer who played as a striker.

Career

Farrington began his career as a youth player with Everton, for whom he played in the 1983 FA Youth Cup final. He failed to secure a professional contract with the Toffees and was released several weeks after the final and instead joined the side that defeated Everton in the final, Norwich City, after impressing manager Ken Brown. He made his debut for Norwich at the end of the 1983–84 season in a match against Coventry City in May 1984 and made a further 17 appearances in all competitions with the club. After struggling to establish himself in the first-team, he spent time on loan at Cambridge United in 1985 before completing a permanent transfer to Cardiff City in July 1985.

He made his debut for Cardiff on the opening day of the 1985–86 season, scoring once during a 4–1 victory over Notts County on 17 August 1985. However, the side struggled in Division Three and Farrington scored just two more league goals during the season, in victories over Lincoln City and Chesterfield, before his contract was terminated by manager Alan Durban after a breach of club discipline.

He instead moved abroad, playing in Germany, the Netherlands and Belgium before returning to England with Brighton & Hove Albion. He played out his career in non-league before retiring.

References

1965 births
Living people
Footballers from Liverpool
English footballers
Association football forwards
Everton F.C. players
Norwich City F.C. players
Cambridge United F.C. players
Cardiff City F.C. players
Willem II (football club) players
K.R.C. Genk players
Fortuna Sittard players
Hertha BSC players
Feyenoord players
Brighton & Hove Albion F.C. players
Hereford United F.C. players
Bundesliga players
Eredivisie players
Belgian Pro League players
English expatriate footballers
Expatriate footballers in the Netherlands
English expatriate sportspeople in the Netherlands
Expatriate footballers in Belgium
English expatriate sportspeople in Belgium
Expatriate footballers in Germany
English expatriate sportspeople in Germany